Carole Ruth Terry (born in 1948) is an American organist, harpsichordist, and pedagogue.

Biography
Carole Terry received her musical training at Southern Methodist University in Dallas, Texas (organ with Robert T. Anderson, harpsichord with Larry Palmer), Eastman School of Music (organ with David Craighead), and Stanford University, where she obtained in 1977 a Doctor of Musical Arts degree in early music performance practice. Her teachers in Stanford were Herbert Nanney (organ), Margaret Fabrizio (harpsichord), and Joan Benson (fortepiano and clavichord).
In 1979, she was appointed professor of organ and harpsichord at the University of Washington in Seattle. From 2000–2003, she was Resident Organist and curator of the C. B. Fisk organ at Benaroya Hall in Seattle.

As organist and harpsichordist, she has performed throughout the United States, Europe, and Asia, and frequently serves as jury member for international organ competitions and lecturer for master classes in keyboard performance practice.

Selected discography
 Brombaugh organs of the Northwest.
 Works of John Dowland, Melchior Schildt, Samuel Scheidt, Jan Pieterszoon Sweelinck, Peter Mohrhardt, Heinrich Scheidemann, and Matthias Weckmann.
 Carole Terry, organ. Recorded in June 1983 on the John Brombaugh organs at Grace Episcopal Church, Ellensburg, WA, Christ Episcopal Church, Tacoma, WA, and Central Lutheran Church, Eugene, OR. Ocean, NJ: Musical Heritage Society, 1986. MHS 7368. 1 LP.
 20th century harpsichord works.
 Vincent Persichetti (Sonata No. 1 op. 51), William Albright (Four Fancies), Ned Rorem (Spiders), and Henry Cowell (Set of four).
 Carole Terry, harpsichord. Recorded in August and November 1985 in Seattle, WA. New York, NY: CRI, 1986 CRI SD 533. 1 LP.
 The complete organ works of Johannes Brahms.
 Carole Terry, organ. Flentrop organ at St. Mark's Episcopal Cathedral, Seattle, WA. Ocean, NJ: Musical Heritage Society, 1990. MHS 512523M. 1 CD.
 Carole Terry in Schwerin.
 Works by Johann Gottlob Töpfer, August Wilhelm Bach, Johann Georg Herzog, Johann Christian Heinrich Rinck, Joseph Rheinberger, Julius Reubke, August Gottfried Ritter, Ernst Friedrich Richter, Robert Schumann, Felix Mendelssohn, Johannes Brahms, and Johann Friedrich Ludwig Thiele.
 Carole Terry, organ. Recorded in August 1996 on the Ladegast organ at Schwerin Cathedral, Germany. Seattle, WA: Ambassador Recording Corporation, 1998. ARC 1021. 2 CDs.
 Carole Terry plays the Watjen concert organ.
 Works by Felix Mendelssohn, Jan Pieterszoon Sweelinck, William Albright, Johann Sebastian Bach, John Stanley, Robert Schumann, Louis Vierne, and Charles-Marie Widor.
 Carole Terry, organ. Recorded on December 13 and 20, 2004, and on September, 2006, on the C. B. Fisk organ Opus 114 at Benaroya Hall, Seattle. Seattle, WA: Loft Recordings, 2008. LRCD-1105. 1 CD.

External links
 Faculty Website at the University of Washington in Seattle, WA
 Artist Biography on the Philip Truckenbrod Concert Artists Website

American classical organists
Women organists
American harpsichordists
Southern Methodist University alumni
Eastman School of Music alumni
Stanford University alumni
1948 births
Living people
Date of birth missing (living people)
Place of birth missing (living people)
21st-century organists
21st-century American women musicians
21st-century American keyboardists